The story of the second season takes place a year after the first season. The Shinsengumi moves back to Edo and prepares for the final battle against the Imperial Army. At the same time, Chizuru's father and older twin brother, Kodo and Kaoru, provides the Water of Life to the enemy faction to create armies of Rasetsu in order to restore the power of the Yukimura clan. 

The anime is produced by Studio Deen. It is also jointly produced by Asuka Yamazaki, Kazuhiko Hasegawa, and Mitsutoshi Ogura, with music composed by Kow Otani, and the story written by Megumu Sasano, Mitsutaka Hirota, Yoshiko Nakamura, and Osamu Yamasaki.

Episode list

Reference

Hakuoki episode lists